The Manitoba Transit Heritage Association Inc. (MTHA) is a non-profit tax charitable organization whose members volunteer in the restoration, maintenance and display of Manitoba’s largest collection of vintage transit vehicles.

The mission of the Association is to restore old transit vehicles for historic purposes; to create a transit museum for display of transit vehicles and related transit-industry memorabilia; and to provide restored transit vehicles for public parades and community event displays.

The MTHA has a fleet of operational historic vehicles, and further vehicles which are awaiting restoration. These buses were previously used in public transportation service (both public and private companies) between 1937 and 2019.

History
The genesis for MTHA was a search in summer 1987 by retired Winnipeg Transit employees Ron Alexander and John Kapusta for old Studebaker automobiles in rural Manitoba. During that search, they found an old electric streetcar in a farm field, and were inspired to found a preservation group for bus, streetcar, and trolleys in Manitoba along with other current and retired Transit employees on July 21, 1989. The group's charter was "restoring old transit vehicles for historical purposes; creating a transit museum for the display of vintage transit vehicles; [providing] restored vehicles to transport senior citizens, disabled persons, school children and other such groups for tours and outings; and [providing] restored transit vehicles for public parades and displays".

Historic collection

Buses
The group's first restoration project was the 1941 Twin Coach 30GS, which had been abandoned in a farm yard in Grand Marais; it was purchased by MTHA for one dollar. The second project was the 1937 Twin Coach 23R, which was in the yard of King's Welding of Ladywood; it was acquired by MTHA in October 1990 and the restored vehicle was unveiled on November 2, 1991. Also in 1990, the group began restoring the 1946 Ford 69B; although work was substantially complete by 1992, it was not fully operational until 2018 due to other projects.

, the 1979 OBI Orion I is intended to serve as a mobile transit museum. MTHA's vehicles have appeared in several television shows and movies filmed in Manitoba, including Less Than Kind and The Don Cherry Story.

Artifacts

In addition to historic vehicles, the MTHA has a large collection of related transit-industry memorabilia such as badges, uniforms, passes, tickets, transfers, transfer punches, fareboxes, decals and manuals.

References

External links 
Manitoba Transit Heritage Association Website
Canadian Public Transit Wiki: Manitoba Transit Heritage Association
Manitoba Transit Heritage Association's photo stream on flickr
The Switch Iron

Charities based in Canada
Transport associations in Canada